The Indian Institute of Advanced Study (IIAS) is a research institute located in Shimla, India. It was set up by the Ministry of Education, Government of India in 1964 and started functioning from 20 October 1965.

History and establishment
The building that houses the institute was originally built as a home for Lord Dufferin, viceroy of India from 1884 to 1888, and was called the Viceregal Lodge. It housed all the subsequent viceroys and governors-general of India. It occupies Observatory Hill, one of the seven hills that Shimla is built upon.

The building was designed by Henry Irwin, an architect in the Public Works Department. The Viceregal Lodge had electricity as early as 1888, much before the rest of the town of Shimla. The building also was equipped with a sophisticated firefighting mechanism through wax-tipped water ducts.

Many historic decisions were taken in the building during the Indian independence movement. The Simla Conference, to discuss self-rule for India, was held here in 1945. The decision to carve out Pakistan and East Pakistan from India was also taken here in 1947.

After India gained independence, the building was renamed as Rashtrapati Niwas and was used as a summer retreat for the president of India. However, due to its neglect, Dr. S Radhakrishnan decided to turn it into a centre of higher learning. The summer retreat of the president was shifted from here to a building known as "The Retreat" situated in Chharabra, on the outskirts of Shimla.

The Indian Institute of Advanced Study was first created as a society on 6 October 1964. The institute was formally inaugurated by Prof. S. Radhakrishnan on 20 October 1965. The eminent historian, professor Niharranjan Ray, was appointed as the first director of the institute.

Around 2004, a rare stické court was discovered on the grounds of the Viceregal Lodge complex.

A bell made of eight metals which was presented by the king of Nepal was available to be admired by tourists until April 2010.

The lawn in front of the lodge is above a water tank. All the rainwater from the building goes to this water tank. This rainwater harvesting system goes back to the 19th century when this building was designed.

The Institute of Advance Studies was the first electrified building in Shimla. This electricity was produced by steam engines which were brought from Britain.

Administration
The institute is administered by a Society and a Governing Body, the members of which come from varied backgrounds. A statutory Finance Committee advises the Governing Body in financial matters.

The director of the institute is assisted by a secretary, a deputy secretary a public relations officer and other supervisory staff.

Academics
The fellows currently focus on the following areas:
 Humanities
 Arts and Aesthetics
 Comparative Study of Literature
 Study of Religion and Philosophy
 Social Sciences
 Development Studies
 Comparative Study of Political Institutions
 Socio-economic and Socio-Cultural Formation in Historical Perspective.
 Natural and Life Sciences
 State Policies on Science and Technology 
 Science, Technology and Development
 Methodologies and Techniques.

Fellowship
The institute has two fellowship programs National Fellows and Fellows. The term National Fellows at the institute is for a maximum period of two years. For Fellows, the backbone of the institute, the duration of regular fellowships ranges from a minimum of six months to a maximum of two years. This depends on the nature of work and its progress. Initially, a fellowship is awarded for a year.

While fellows of the institute are primarily engaged in their own research on themes approved by the institute, the considerable formal and informal interaction amongst them encourages a healthy interdisciplinary dialogue. From April to November, the fellows' weekly seminar is the primary forum for formal interaction. During their term, fellows remain in residence from April to November. From December to March, they may engage in field work, library and archival consultations outside Shimla. Upon the completion of their term, fellows are required to submit their completed research work in the form of a monograph to the institute. The monographs submitted by them are considered for publication by the Institute – which also retains the first right of publication.

Visiting professors, visiting scholars and guest scholars 
Apart from fellows, other scholars also contribute to, and benefit from, the institute. They come as visiting professors, visiting scholars and guest scholars. Visiting professors are eminent scholars invited by the Governing Body of the institute to deliver lectures and give seminars at the institute. During an in-residence stay of up to four weeks, they also interact informally with fellows of the institute. Similarly, visiting scholars also come to the institute on invitation. Like visiting professors, they too are distinguished in their respective fields, but their stay is limited to a week and all facilities of the institute are extended to them. Guest scholars visit the Institute – subject to the availability of accommodation; they too are welcome to utilize the facilities on a nominal payment. The visiting professors to IIAS includes a large number of philosophers which include Prof. Kanchana Natarajan, and Prof. Enakshi Ray Mitra.

The International Centre for Human Development (IC4HD)
The International Centre for Human Development (IC4HD) is set up in IIAS to support efforts by governments of the South to integrate human development approaches and ensure improved development outcomes for poor and marginalized people. The IC4HD center was inaugurated on 19 August 2013 in the institute with the aim to promote policy dialogue on human development in the Global South and work towards translating human development analysis into action. The partnership between the Ministry of Human Resource Development, Government of India, the Indian Institute of Advanced Study, and the United Nations Development Programme (UNDP) was officially launched at an event held in Delhi on 4 January 2013. The centre will provide a range of services to national governments in translating human development approach into policy through a four-pronged approach viz. Policy Advisory Services, South-South Cooperation, Research on HD issues and Monitoring and Evaluation.

Tagore Centre
On the 150th birth anniversary of Rabindranath Tagore, the Indian Institute of Advanced Study (IIAS) was awarded the Tagore Centre for the Study of Culture and Civilization by the HRD Ministry of Government of India.

Activities of the Tagore Centre
 There are four fellows in residence at the Centre every year. None of the fellows are permanent and their term is for a minimum of six months to a maximum of two years. They enjoy facilities similar to those enjoyed by the fellows of IIAS. One of the fellows may be either a poet, or a writer, or an artist-in-residence as a tribute to Tagore's multifaceted personality. Another may be a scholar from outside India. The fellows are known as Tagore Fellows.
 An annual International Seminar on some aspect of Tagore's concerns is proposed to be conducted. This will preferably not be of an exegetical nature but more an engagement with his substantial concerns as stated in the vision document.
 A study week on Tagore's works would be organized every alternate year.
 An artist camp could perhaps be organized every alternate year.
 An annual Tagore Lecture would be organized.

IIAS Library
Established in 1965, the library has been established to facilitate, promote and support research to Fellows of the institute. It is one of the leading research and reference libraries in Humanities and Social Science in the country. The social science collections, in fact, are worldwide in coverage and significance.

Publications
The institute has published over 450 works. These include monographs submitted by its fellows; edited proceedings of seminars, symposia, workshops and conferences held at the institute; lectures given by visiting professors; and occasional papers presented by fellows and visitors to the institute.

The institute also publishes two academic journals. Their review journal, Summerhill: IIAS Review, carries reviews of books published by the institute and those received from outside, as well as interviews and important information about the various academic activities of the institute. A biannual journal, Studies in Humanities and Social Sciences, is published under the auspices of the Inter-University Centre for Humanities and Social Sciences.

Gallery

References

External links

 IIAS website's page about the Institute

Educational institutions established in 1964
Universities and colleges in Himachal Pradesh
Education in Shimla
1964 establishments in Himachal Pradesh
British-era buildings in Himachal Pradesh